The 1988 Italian Open was a tennis tournament played on outdoor clay courts at the Foro Italico in Rome in Italy, that was part of the 1988 Nabisco Grand Prix and of Tier IV of the 1988 WTA Tour. The men's tournament was held from May 9 through May 15, 1988, while the women's tournament was held from 2 May until 8 May 1988.

Finals

Men's singles

 Ivan Lendl defeated  Guillermo Pérez Roldán 2–6, 6–4, 6–2, 4–6, 6–4
 It was Lendl's 2nd title of the year and the 78th of his career.

Women's singles

 Gabriela Sabatini defeated  Helen Kelesi 6–1, 6–7, 6–1
 It was Sabatini's 3rd title of the year and the 15th of her career.

Men's doubles

 Jorge Lozano /  Todd Witsken defeated  Anders Järryd /  Tomáš Šmíd 6–3, 6–3
 It was Lozano's 2nd title of the year and the 2nd of his career. It was Witsken's 2nd title of the year and the 2nd of his career.

Women's doubles

 Jana Novotná /  Catherine Suire defeated  Jenny Byrne /  Janine Tremelling 6–3, 4–6, 7–5
 It was Novotná's 2nd title of the year and the 5th of her career. It was Suire's 2nd title of the year and the 5th of her career.

References

External links
 ITF tournament edition details
 Official website 
 ATP tournament profile
 WTA tournament profile